is a private university in the western part of Tokyo, Japan. Its three campuses are in Mitaka and Hachiōji, Tokyo. It was established in 1970. The predecessor of the school, Mitaka Shinkawa Hospital, was founded in 1953 by Shinyu Matsuda.

History
Mitaka Shinkawa Hospital was founded in 1953 as a sanitarium for tuberculosis at the current location of the Mitaka campus of Kyorin University. Two years after, the training school for assistant nurses opened. The hospital added psychiatric and general medical wards, and, in 1963, Tokyo Mitaka Shinkawa General Hospital was chartered.

In 1966, Kyorin Educational Foundation was founded and Kyorin Junior College (ja), which was reorganized to Faculty of Health Sciences of Kyorin University in 1979, started to develop Medical Laboratory Scientists. When Kyorin University School of Medicine was established in 1970, Tokyo Mitaka Shinkawa General Hospital was reconstituted as Kyorin University Hospital.

Campus 
Mitaka Campus (Headquarters) - 6-20-2, Shinkawa, Mitaka City, Tokyo
Inokashira Campus - 5-4-1, Shimorenjaku, Mitaka City, Tokyo
Hachiōji Campus - 476, Miyashitamachi, Hachiōji City, Tokyo

Organization
The university has four undergraduate faculties and three graduate schools.

Faculties and Departments
 Faculty of Foreign Studies
 Department of Chinese Communication
 Department of English Language
 Department of Hospitality and Tourism
 Faculty of Health Sciences
 Department of Clinical Engineering
 Department of Health and Welfare
 Department of Medical Radiological Technology 
 Department of Medical Technology
 Department of Nursing
 Department of Occupational Therapy
 Department of Paramedics
 Department of Physical Therapy
 Faculty of Medicine
 Department of Medicine
 Faculty of Social Sciences
 Department of Business Administration
 Department of Policy Studies

Graduate Schools
 Graduate School of Health Sciences
 Graduate School of International Cooperation Studies
 Graduate School of Medicine

References

External links
 Official website

Educational institutions established in 1970
Private universities and colleges in Japan
Universities and colleges in Tokyo
Mitaka, Tokyo
Hachiōji, Tokyo
1970 establishments in Japan